Pedro Antonio Liriano (born October 23, 1980 in Fantino, Dominican Republic) is a former professional baseball starting pitcher. He played in Major League Baseball for the Milwaukee Brewers and Philadelphia Phillies.

In , Liriano played for the San Francisco Giants' Triple-A affiliate, the Fresno Grizzlies. In , he played for the Los Angeles Angels of Anaheim's Triple-A affiliate, the Salt Lake Bees. In 28 games (25 starts), he was 4–12 with a 5.59 ERA and 67 strikeouts. Liriano played for the Tecolotes de Nuevo Laredo of the Mexican League in 2010. He last played in 2014, in the independent Atlantic League.

External links

1980 births
Living people
Bridgeport Bluefish players
Camden Riversharks players
Dominican Republic expatriate baseball players in the United States
Estrellas Orientales players 
Fresno Grizzlies players
Gigantes de Carolina players
Dominican Republic expatriate baseball players in Puerto Rico
Huntsville Stars players
Indianapolis Indians players

Major League Baseball pitchers
Major League Baseball players from the Dominican Republic
Milwaukee Brewers players
Navegantes del Magallanes players
Philadelphia Phillies players
Provo Angels players
Rancho Cucamonga Quakes players
Salt Lake Bees players
Scranton/Wilkes-Barre Red Barons players
Senadores de San Juan players
Sugar Land Skeeters players
Tecolotes de Nuevo Laredo players
Tiburones de La Guaira players
Tigres del Licey players
York Revolution players
Dominican Republic expatriate baseball players in Venezuela